United Nations Security Council Resolution 23, adopted on April 18, 1947, determined that the commission created by United Nations Security Council Resolution 15 would remain in the area and be enlarged.

The resolution passed with nine votes to none; Poland and the Soviet Union abstained.

See also
 List of United Nations Security Council Resolutions 1 to 100 (1946–1953)

References
Text of the Resolution at undocs.org

External links
 

 0023
Albania–Greece border
 0023
 0023
 0023
 0023
1947 in Yugoslavia
1947 in Greece
1947 in Albania
1947 in Bulgaria
April 1947 events